Roberto Gayón Márquez (born 1 January 1905 in San José, Costa Rica, date of death unknown) was a professional footballer who played as a forward who made two appearances for Mexico at the 1930 FIFA World Cup. Born in Costa Rica, he represented the Mexico national team.

International goals
Mexico's goal tally first

References

External links

1905 births
Year of death missing
Footballers from Mexico City
Association football forwards
Mexican footballers
Mexico international footballers
1930 FIFA World Cup players